The history of the Jews in Finland goes back to the 1700s. Finnish Jews are Jews who are citizens of Finland. The country is home to some 1,800 Jews, of which 1,400 live in the Greater Helsinki area and 200 in Turku. Most Jews in Finland have Finnish or Swedish as their mother tongue, and many speak Yiddish, German, Russian and Hebrew. Jews originally came to Finland as Russian soldiers who stayed in Finland in the 19th century after their military service ended (knows as Cantonists). There are Jewish congregations in Helsinki and Turku with their own synagogues built in 1906 and 1912. The Wiborg Synagogue built 1910–1911 was destroyed in air bombings during the first day of the Winter War in 30 November 1939. There has been relatively little antisemitism in Finland.

Early history, 1700–1917

The first Jew said to have settled on Finnish soil was Jacob Weikam, later Veikkanen, in 1782, in the town of Hamina, which was at that point under Russian rule. During that time, most of Finland was included in the Kingdom of Sweden. In Sweden, Jews were allowed to reside in a 3 towns – all of them outside the territory that is now modern-day Finland. In 1809 Finland became part of the Russian Empire, as an autonomous Grand Duchy, but Swedish laws remained in force, meaning Jews were still unable to settle in Finnish territory according to the Judereglementet.

Rabbi Yitzchak Blazer (also known as R' Itzele Peterberger), one of the foremost disciples of Rabbi Yisrael Salanter and the Mussar Movement, served as chief rabbi of Helsinki on Rabbi Yisrael's instruction, from 1867 to 1875.

Despite the legal difficulties, during the period of Finnish autonomy (1809–1917) Russian Jews established themselves in Finland as tradesmen and craftsmen. As Jews were in principle prohibited from dwelling in Finland, almost all these Jews were retired soldiers from the Imperial Russian army. Being cantonists, forced into the Russian army in childhood, they were required to serve at least 25 years. After their term expired, they had, however, the right to remain in Finland regardless of the Finnish ban on Jewish settlement, a right forcefully defended by the Russian military authorities. It was only after Finland declared independence in 1917 that Jews were granted full rights as Finnish citizens.

Jewish youths in Helsinki founded in 1906 the sports association IK Stjärnan (later Makkabi Helsinki) That the society is founded in 1906 makes it the oldest Jewish sports club in the world that has an uninterrupted history.

World War II

Finland's involvement in World War II began during the Winter War (30 November 1939 – 13 March 1940), the Soviet Union's invasion of Finland prior to Operation Barbarossa (launched in June 1941). Finnish Jews were among those made refugees from the ceded territories. The Wiborg Synagogue was also destroyed by air bombings during the Winter War.

Following Soviet air strikes, Finland waged war against the Soviet Union in the Continuation War (1941–1944). While Germany launched Barbarossa, Finland simultaneously resumed hostilities against the Soviet Union. This resulted in Finland fighting alongside Nazi Germany. 327 Finnish Jews fought for Finland during the war, of which were 242 rank-and-file soldiers, 52 non-commissioned officers, 18 officers and 15 medical officers. Additionally, 21 Jews served in the women's auxiliary Lotta Svärd. 15 Finnish Jews were killed in action in the Winter War and eight in the Continuation War.

As Finland's forces had substantial numbers of German forces supporting their operations, the Finnish front had a field synagogue operating in the presence of Nazi troops. Jewish soldiers were granted leave on Saturdays and Jewish holidays. Finnish Jewish soldiers later participated in the Lapland War against Germany.

In November 1942, eight Jewish Austrian refugees (along with 19 other deportees) were deported to Nazi Germany after the head of the Finnish police agreed to turn them over. Seven of the Jews were murdered immediately. According to author Martin Gilbert, these eight were Georg Kollman; Frans Olof Kollman; Frans Kollman's mother; Hans Eduard Szubilski; Henrich Huppert; Kurt Huppert; Hans Robert Martin Korn, who had been a volunteer in the Winter War; and an unknown individual. When Finnish media reported the news, it caused a national scandal, and ministers resigned in protest. After protests by Lutheran ministers, the Archbishop, and the Social Democratic Party, no more foreign Jewish refugees were deported from Finland.
Approximately 500 Jewish refugees arrived in Finland during World War II, although about 350 moved on to other countries, including about 160 who were transferred to neutral Sweden to save their lives on the direct orders of Marshal Carl Gustaf Emil Mannerheim, the commander of the Finnish Army. About 40 of the remaining Jewish refugees were sent to do compulsory labor service in Salla in Lapland in March 1942. The refugees were moved to Kemijärvi in June and eventually to Suursaari Island in the Gulf of Finland. Although Heinrich Himmler twice visited Finland to try to persuade the authorities to hand over the Jewish population, he was unsuccessful.

In 1942, an exchange of Soviet POWs took place between Finland and Germany. Approximately 2,600–2,800 Soviet prisoners of war of various nationalities then held by Finland were exchanged for 2,100 Soviet POWs of Baltic Finn nationalities (Finnish, Karelian, Ingrian, or Estonian) held by Germany, who might have volunteered in the Finnish army. About 2000 of the POWs handed over by Finland joined the Wehrmacht. Among the rest there were about 500 people (mainly Soviet political officers) who were considered politically dangerous in Finland. This latter group most likely perished in concentration camps or were executed as per the Commissar Order. Based on a list of names, there were 47 Jews among the extradited, although they were not extradited based on religion.

Jews with Finnish citizenship were protected during the whole period. Late in the war, Germany's ambassador to Helsinki Wipert von Blücher concluded in a report to Hitler that Finns would not endanger their citizens of Jewish origin in any situation. According to historian Henrik Meinander, this was realistically accepted by Hitler. 

Three Finnish Jews were offered the Iron Cross for their wartime service: Leo Skurnik, Salomon Klass, and Dina Poljakoff. Major Leo Skurnik, a district medical officer in the Finnish Army, organized an evacuation of a German field hospital when it came under Soviet shelling. More than 600 patients, including SS soldiers, were evacuated. Captain Salomon Klass, also of the Finnish Army, who had lost an eye in the Winter War, led a Finnish unit that rescued a German company that had been surrounded by the Soviets. Dina Poljakoff, a member of Lotta Svärd, the Finnish women's auxiliary service, was a nursing assistant who helped tend to German wounded, and came to be greatly admired by her patients. All three refused the award.

President of Finland, Marshal Mannerheim attended the memorial service for the fallen at the Helsinki Synagogue on 6 December 1944.

Finnish Prime Minister Paavo Lipponen issued an official apology in 2000 for the extradition of the eight Jewish refugees.

Finland was the only Axis country where synagogues remained open throughout World War II.

Today

During the 1948 Arab–Israeli War, about 28 Finnish Jews, mostly Finnish Army veterans, fought for the State of Israel. After Israel's establishment, Finland had a high rate of immigration to Israel (known as "aliyah"), which depleted Finland's Jewish community. The community was somewhat revitalized when some Soviet Jews immigrated to Finland following the collapse of the Soviet Union.

The number of Jews in Finland in 2020 was approximately 1,800, of whom 1,400 lived in Helsinki, about 200 in Turku, and about 50 in Tampere. The Jews are well integrated into Finnish society and are represented in nearly all sectors. Most Finnish Jews are corporate employees or self-employed professionals.

Most Finnish Jews speak Finnish or Swedish as their mother tongue. Yiddish, German, Russian, and Hebrew are also spoken in the community. The Jews, like Finland's other traditional minorities as well as immigrant groups, are represented on the Advisory Board for Ethnic Relations.

There are two synagogues: one in Helsinki and one in Turku. Helsinki also has a Jewish day school, which serves about 110 students (many of them the children of Israelis working in Finland); and a Chabad Lubavitch rabbi is based there.

Tampere previously had an organized Jewish community, but it stopped functioning in 1981. The other two cities continue to run their community organizations. There are also some Reform Jewish activities in Finland today.

Antisemitism 

Historically, antisemitic hate crimes have been rare, and the Jewish community is relatively safe. However, there have been some antisemitic crimes reported in the last decade; the most common types include defamation, verbal threats, and damage to property.

In 2011, Ben Zyskowicz, the first Finnish Jewish parliamentarian, was assaulted by a man shouting antisemitic slurs. Four years later, a few campaign advertisements containing Zyskowicz's picture were sprayed with swastikas in Helsinki.

The Helsingin Sanomat, Finland's largest subscription newspaper, published a satirical cartoon depicting a 1943 scene of a German guard holding a bar of "Free Range Jew soap." However, as the author, cartoonist Pertti Jarla, points out, he was making fun of the double moralism of National Socialism, but the humor was so black that the strip was commonly misinterpreted.

According to writer and Finnish resident Ken Sikorski, there has been an increase in anti-Israeli and anti-Semitic bias in the country. Sikorski gave a number of alleged examples in his interview with Dr. Manfred Gerstenfeld in July 2013.

According to Sikorski, one example of anti-Semitism was the journalist Kyösti Niemelä writing in the Helsinki University paper Yliopisto that a Holocaust denier could teach a university class on Jewish history. Niemelä's argument was that even high school teachers can talk about controversial issues without revealing their 'political opinions.' According to Sikorski, Niemelä thus reduced Holocaust denial to a 'political opinion.'

Finally, Sikorski states that he witnessed Muslims giving the Nazi salute or shouting "Allahu Akbar!" ("Allah is great!") during pro-Israel rallies.

In 2015 the Fundamental Rights Agency published its annual overview of data on antisemitism available in the European Union. The document displays information from a report of the Police College of Finland. Since 2008, the report has covered religiously motivated hate crimes, including antisemitic crimes. The recent documented data is from 2013, when most of the incidents (six out of eleven) concerned verbal threats/harassments.

See also
 List of Finnish Jews
 Israel-Finland relations
 Finnish culture
 Elias Katz
 Wiborg Synagogue

References

Further reading
 Cohen, William B. and Jörgen Svensson (1995). Finland and the Holocaust. Holocaust and Genocide Studies 9(1):70–93.
 Rautkallio, Hannu (1988). Finland and the Holocaust. The Rescue of Finland's Jews. N.Y.:Holocaust Publications. .
 Cohen, William B. & Jürgen Svensson (2001). Finland. In Walter Laqueur, ed., The Holocaust Encyclopedia. New Haven, CT: Yale University Press. pp. 204–206. .

External links
 Jewish Community of Helsinki
 Chabad Lubavitch of Finland
 What's in it for non-Christians, thisisFINLAND
 Jews in Finland During the Second World War
 ‘While Jews serve in my army I will not allow their deportation’ Jewish Quarterly